Cherdpong Punsoni (born 17 November 1947) is a Thai judoka. He competed in the men's middleweight event at the 1972 Summer Olympics.

References

1947 births
Living people
Cherdpong Punsoni
Cherdpong Punsoni
Judoka at the 1972 Summer Olympics
Place of birth missing (living people)
Cherdpong Punsoni